A balaur (pl. balauri) in Romanian folklore is a type of many-headed dragon or monstrous serpent, sometimes said to be equipped with wings.  The number of heads is usually around three, but they can also have seven heads or even twelve heads according to some legends.

The balaur in folktale is typically evil, demanding or abducting young maidens or the princess, and defeated by the hero such as Saint George or the fair youth Făt-Frumos.

There is some lore in which the balaur is considered weather-making, and living in an airborne state, but these types of balaur are sometimes interchangeably called hala or ala, being confounded with the pan-Slavic air and water demon. The balaur (instead of the zmeu) is the vehicle of the weather-controlling Solomonari according to some sources.

There are also legends about the balaur in which they can produce precious stones from their saliva. Also, it is said that whoever manages to slay it will be forgiven a sin.

General description 

In the Romanian language, balauri are "monstrous serpents" or dragons. Alternatively, the word balaur can be used to describe any monster like creature.  They are many-headed like the Greek hell-hound Cerberus or the hydra and are winged and golden, according to Lazăr Șăineanu.

As reported by journalist Eustace Clare Grenville Murray, in Romanian folklore the balaur or balaurul is a serpentine being who guards treasures and princesses, coming to blows against heroic Fêt-Frumos.

The balaur recurs in Romanian folktales as a ravenous dragon that preys upon maidens only to be defeated by the hero Făt-Frumos ("Handsome Lad"). The balaur may also be the abductor of the princess Ileana Cosânzeana, although according to Șăineanu the kidnapper of this princess is a zmeu in the form of giant with pebbly tails (or scaly tails). It is noted that the balaur and the zmeu are often confounded with each other.

According to folklorist Tudor Pamfile, there are three types of balauri in folk tradition: water-, land-, and air-dwelling. A type of balaur of the first type is a seven-headed monster that dwells in the well of a village, demanding maidens as sacrifice until defeated by either the hero named Busuioc or by Saint George.

The second type of balaur, according to Pamfile, is said to dwell in the "Armenian land" where they produce precious stones. In Wallachia, it is also believed that the saliva of a balaur can form precious stones, according to American writer Cora Linn Daniels. Romanian scholar Mircea Eliade noted that the notion a precious stones are formed from a snake's spittle is widespread, from England to China.

The balaur is often associated with the weather and is alternatively called hala or ala, which is usually a Slavic term for a weather demon. This is the type Pamfile calls the "third type" that is air-dwelling. When two balauri meet and fight in the air, there ensues various meteorological damages such as uprooting of trees, or objects being tossed about. Another  tradition is that the balaur uses the rainbow as its path and sucks moisture from any spot in order to cause rain. There is also lore about the balaur which is said to be quite similar to the Bulgarian Banat lore about the lamia (locally called lam'a), which states that the lam'a draw water from the sea to fill the cloud.

Although the dragons ridden by the Solomonari are often said to be zmei (sing. zmeu), they were balauri according to some sources. A balaur was controlled by these weather-controlling sorcerers using "a golden rein" (or golden bridle). The dragons were usually kept hidden in the depths of a lake, until summoned by their riders.

Etymology  
The term Balaur (Aromanian bul'ar) is of unknown etymology. It has been linked with Albanian boljë/bollë ("snake") and buljar ("water snake"), terms possibly stemming from the same Thracian root, *bell- or *ber- "beast, monster", the traces of which can also be found in the name of the Greek mythological hero Bellerophon ("the beast killer").

The Transylvanian Saxon balaur "dragon", and balaura, an insult term in Serbia, are borrowed from Romanian. The Serbo-Croatian blavor/blaor/blavur ("European legless lizard") is cognate with balaur, and is regarded as one of the few pre-Slavic Balkan relict words in Serbo-Croatian.

The maniraptor theropod Balaur bondoc is named after this creature.

Popular culture
 In the MMORPG Aion, the Dragons that once ruled the world and are the enemy are called the Balaur.
 In the MMORPG Star Trek Online the largest class of Gorn warship is the Balaur Dreadnought.
 In Ace Combat: Joint Assault, there is a gigantic railgun weapon named the Balaur.
In the 2020 TV series Dracula, the Count uses the alias "Mr. Balaur".

See also
 Hydra
 Slavic dragon
 Scholomance
 Solomonari
 Zmeu

Explanatory notes

References
Citations

Further reading
 Drăgulescu, Radu. "ANALYSIS OF THE CONNOTATIVE AND DENOTATIVE MEANINGS OF THE TERM ”DRAGON” (BALAUR) AS IT APPEARS IN THE ROMANIAN PHYTONYMY". In: Journal of Romanian Literary Studies 10 (2007): 104-110.

European dragons
Romanian legendary creatures
Mythological monsters
Mythical many-headed creatures